Nilendra Iomal Russell de Mel is a Sri Lankan banker and accountant who served as Chief Executive Officer, Head - Corporate Banking Group. Head of Group Risk Management. At the National Development  Bank in addition to being a director of several NDB holdings.,

Education
De Mel was educated at S. Thomas' College, Mount Lavinia where he was a junior librarian and a member of the photographic society.  He was reported to be an “avid photographer” in later life.

Professional
De Mel is a Fellow of the Chartered Institute of Management Accountants and served for 30 years in the National Development Bank retiring as CEO.

References 

Alumni of S. Thomas' College, Mount Lavinia
Living people
Year of birth missing (living people)